Shah Abdul Hamid 1 (1900 – 1 May 1972) was a Bangladeshi political activist, Awami League politician, legislator and banker.

Early life
Hamid was born into a Muslim family in the village of Khalshi of Gobindagonj in Rangpur district, East Bengal, India, now Gaibandha, Bangladesh. His father was Hazi Abdul Gafur Shah and Mother Rahima Khatun. He was awarded a Bachelor of Arts from Carmichael College of Rangpur in 1920.

Hamid participated in the Non Co-operation Movement initiated by Desh Bandhu Chitta Ranjan Das. In 1927, he obtained a law degree from Calcutta University and began practice at the Court of Gaibandha.

Professional life

After completion of his education, he returned to Gaibandha and started working as a sports organizer. He was the General Secretary of Gaibandha Town Club.  He played the pioneer role in founding the Gaibandha College in 1947 of which he became the first Secretary of the Managing Committee. He was elected Chairman of the Rangpur School Board in 1949.

He was actively associated with "Jeorge Coronation Dramatic Club" (now Gibandha Nattya Sangstha) and performed on stage.

He was Director of the National Bank of Pakistan from 1951 to 1955.

Political life

Shah Abdul Hamid took part in the Law defying Movement in 1930. In 1936, he joined the Muslim League.
In 1941, Hamid was elected Vice Chairman of Rangpur District Board, a post he was to hold for 12 years.

In 1945, he was elected Member of the Legislative Assembly of India.  He joined Bangladesh Awami League in 1956 and was the President of Rangpur Awami League up to 1966.

In 1970, representing the Awami League, he was elected member of the National Assembly of Pakistan for Rangpur V (Gobindaganj-Palashbari).  At the very outset of the Liberation War, he went to India and played a vital role in organizing the resistance movement.

Hamid was the first Speaker of the Jatiya Sangsad of the Gana Parishad (National Assembly), serving from 10 April to 1 May 1972.

The Shah Abdul Hamid Stadium, Gaibandha, is named in his honour.

References

Politics of Bangladesh
Speakers of the Jatiya Sangsad
1900 births
1972 deaths
University of Calcutta alumni
20th-century Pakistani lawyers
20th-century Pakistani businesspeople